"Crazy Water" is a song by English musician Elton John with lyrics written by Bernie Taupin. It is the seventh track on his 1976 album, Blue Moves. It was released as a single in the UK in February 1977.  The single reached No. 27 in the UK singles charts.

"Crazy Water" was sporadically performed by John during his concert tours with percussionist Ray Cooper from 1977 until 2012.

Personnel
Elton John – piano, vocals
Paul Buckmaster – conductor
Cindy Bullens – backing vocals
Ray Cooper – percussion
Martyn Ford – strings
Ron Hicklin – backing vocals
Bruce Johnston – backing vocals
Davey Johnstone – electric guitar
Jon Joyce – backing vocals
Gene Morford – backing vocals
James Newton-Howard – clavinet
Kenny Passarelli – bass guitar
Roger Pope – drums
Caleb Quaye – electric guitar
Toni Tennille – backing vocals

References

Elton John songs
1977 singles
Songs with music by Elton John
Songs with lyrics by Bernie Taupin
Song recordings produced by Gus Dudgeon
1977 songs
DJM Records singles
MCA Records singles